Dvinosauroidea is a superfamily of dvinosaurian temnospondyls that lived during the Late Carboniferous period.

Gallery

References

Dvinosaurs